The general strike of 1893 was a major general strike in Belgium in April 1893 called by the Belgian Labour Party (POB–BWP) to pressure the government of Auguste Beernaert to introduce universal male suffrage in elections. The general strike was the first called in Belgium and a decisive moment for the nascent socialist movement in Belgium. According to the historian Carl J. Strikwerda, it was the first true general strike in the history of Europe.

Strike

The general strike was called on the evening of 11 April 1893 after politicians of Catholic and Liberal parties joined to block a proposal to expand the suffrage. It lasted from 12–18 April. Conservatives, led by the Catholic Prime Minister Auguste Beernaert, feared a full revolution and clashes broke out between strikers and the military. According to Henri Pirenne, the strike was only called under pressure from the miners of the Borinage and its rapid spread took the POB–BWP leadership, under Emile Vandervelde, by surprise. Between 13 and 20 strikers were killed. In total, approximately 200,000 workers participated in the strike. In the face of determined opposition, the Parliament caved to the Socialist demands and introduced the original reforms, increasing the franchise ten-fold.

The first elections under the reformed franchise took place in October 1894. It did not benefit the POB–BWP as much as expected. The rise of Social Catholicism, introduced by the Papal encyclical Rerum novarum in 1891, was one of the factors which prevented rapid socialist growth. The elections however brought socialist deputies into parliament for the first time and led to the beginning Liberals' decline from one of the two dominant parties in Belgian politics. Neal Ascherson argued that, after 1894, "the deepest preoccupation of politics was the determination of Catholic and Liberal to keep the Socialists out of power." The POB-BWP adopted a new manifesto, the Charter of Quaregnon, the same year which would remain the party's doctrine until 1979.

The issue of electoral reform remained controversial until World War I and further general strikes on questions of franchise reform occurred in 1902 and 1913. The 1913 strike lead to the promise of reform to the plural voting system, but this was halted by the outbreak of World War I and subsequent German occupation. Plural voting was finally abolished in 1919 and universal suffrage, giving the vote to all Belgian women, was only introduced in 1948.

See also

Belgian strike of 1886, the closest precedent for the 1893 general strike
General strikes in Belgium
Belgium in the long nineteenth century

Notes and references

References

Bibliography

Further reading

External links

De grootste stakingen uit de Belgische geschiedenis at De Standaard

1893 Belgian General Strike
Social history of Belgium
Socialism in Belgium
1893 in Belgium
1893 labor disputes and strikes
1893 riots
Suffrage
April 1893 events